Retford is a market town in the Bassetlaw District of Nottinghamshire, England.  The town contains 129 listed buildings that are recorded in the National Heritage List for England.  Of these, six are at Grade II*, the middle of the three grades, and the others are at Grade II, the lowest grade.   Most of the listed buildings are houses, cottages and associated structures, shops, banks and offices, public buildings, churches, chapels and associated structures, public houses and hotels, schools and associated structures.  The other listed buildings include an ancient stone, two groups of almshouses, a museum, a mill, a cannon, a railway station, a canal crane, two war memorials and a cinema.


Key

Buildings

References

Citations

Sources

 

Lists of listed buildings in Nottinghamshire
L